Skip Sweetser (born August 29, 1936) is an American rower. He competed in the men's eight event at the 1960 Summer Olympics. His great-great-grandfather, Warren Sweetser, built Warren Sweetser House in 1842.

References

External links
 

1936 births
Living people
American male rowers
Olympic rowers of the United States
Rowers at the 1960 Summer Olympics
Sportspeople from Kansas City, Kansas